Arfin Rumey is a Bangladeshi singer, musician, composer, lyricist, music director and model.

Biography
Arfin Rumey attended the Dhaka Government Muslim School. He completed his college study at Sharawardi College and then was admitted to Jagannath University, where he earned an honours degree in Finance and Banking. He also learned audio engineering. He was a cricketer and played as an allrounder in different clubs of Dhaka.

He married Lamiya Islam Ananna; they have one son but they are divorced. His second marriage is with Kamrun Nessa. His manager is his mother, Nasima Akter Rozi.

Music projects

Solo albums

Mixed and featuring albums

Film playback
 Projapoti (2008)
 Common Gender (2011)
 Chorabali (2012)
 Chaya Chobi (2012)
 Most Welcome (2012)
 Eito Bhalobasha (2013)
 Hero: The Superstar (2014)
 Taarkata (2014)
 Prem Korbo Tomar Sathe (2014)
 Pita Putrer Golpo (2014)
 Most Welcome 2 (2015)
 Cheleti Abol Tabol Meyeti Pagol Pagol (2015)
 Lal Tip (2015)
 Gangster Returns (2015)
 Game (2015)
 Samraat: The King Is Here (2016)
 Mastan O Police (2017)
 Game Returns (2017)
 Jannat (2018)

TV shows
 Smile show - ATN Bangla (2011–present)
 Poriborton - BTV (2016–present)

Actor in film and drama
 Priyo Maa (2013)
 Chaya Chobi (2013)
 Game Returns (2017)
 Jannat (2018)

Awards
 15th Meril-Prothom Alo Awards-Best Singer (2012)
 16th Meril-Prothom Alo Awards-Best Singer (2013)
 Urocola Award (3 times)
 Bangla Media Award (2016)

References

External links
 
 

1984 births
Living people
21st-century Bangladeshi male singers
21st-century Bangladeshi singers
Bangladeshi composers
Best Male Singer Meril-Prothom Alo Award winners
Laser Vision artists